The Anatomy of Power is a book written by Harvard economist John Kenneth Galbraith, originally published in 1983 by Houghton Mifflin Harcourt.  It sought to classify three types of power: compensatory power in which submission is bought, condign power in which submission is won by making the alternative sufficiently painful, and conditioned power in which submission is gained by persuasion. In short, money, force and ideology.

It further divided power by source: power either stems from personality or leadership, property or wealth, or organisation.

The book goes on to detail a brief history of the use of power, noting the broad arc of history in moving away from condign and towards compensatory and then conditioned power, and from personality and property towards organisation.  Finally, it details what Galbraith views as the main sources of power in the modern world: government, the military, religion and the press.

See also
 Global policeman
 Ideocracy
 International law
 Power politics
 Power Politics (Wight book)
 State collapse
 Superpower collapse
 The True Believer: Thoughts on the Nature of Mass Movements

References

External links
 Abridgement of The Anatomy of Power

1983 non-fiction books
Houghton Mifflin books
International law
Books by John Kenneth Galbraith
Books about political power